Three Smart Boys is a 1937 Our Gang short comedy film directed by Gordon Douglas. It was the 153rd Our Gang short released (154th episode, 65th talking short, and 66th talking episode).

Plot
The boys are anxious to get out of school. They overhear the superintendent of the area's schools talking with Miss Lawrence who wants to close the school for a week to attend a sister's wedding. She was initially denied stating that only an epidemic would justify closing school. Spanky then decides to stage a phony epidemic with Alfalfa and Buckwheat. This time, it is the measles, requiring the boys to paint blotches on their faces. The plan comes a-cropper when, while visiting the doctor (Sidney Bracey), the boys are led to believe that Buckwheat has been transformed into a monkey. Spanky and Alfalfa think Buckwheat is still a monkey. That was when he found out that the superintendent changed her mind and decided to let Miss Lawrence to attend the wedding after all and the school would be closed for a week.

Cast

The Gang
 Eugene Lee as Porky
 George McFarland as Spanky
 Carl Switzer as Alfalfa
 Billie Thomas as Buckwheat
 Darwood Kaye as Waldo

Additional cast
 Sidney Bracey as O.T. Hertz, the veterinary doctor
 Nora Cecil as Miss Witherspoon, Superintendent
 Jack Egan as The assistant
 Rosina Lawrence as Miss Lawrence, Teacher
 Darla Hood as Darla
 Shirley Coates as Girl with Darla
 George the Monk as Monkey

Production notes
Three Smart Boys marked the eighth and final appearance of Rosina Lawrence as teacher "Miss Jones." The film was marginally edited due to perceived racism toward African Americans on the syndicated Little Rascals television package in 1971.

See also
 Our Gang filmography

References

External links

1937 films
American black-and-white films
1937 comedy films
Films directed by Gordon Douglas
Hal Roach Studios short films
Our Gang films
1930s American films
1930s English-language films